Fred Wood (29 March 1901 – 7 February 1957) was  a former Australian rules footballer who played with Richmond in the Victorian Football League (VFL).

Notes

External links 
		

1901 births
1957 deaths
Australian rules footballers from Victoria (Australia)
Richmond Football Club players